Valeriia Zalizna (born 25 April 1996) is a Ukrainian road and track cyclist, who last rode for UCI Women's Team , and represents Ukraine at international competitions. In 2015, she won the individual pursuit at the Ukrainian National Track Championships. She competed at the 2016 UEC European Track Championships in the team sprint event.

Major results
2014
 Grand Prix Galichyna
2nd Team sprint (with Viktoriya Bondar)
3rd Sprint

References

External links

1996 births
Living people
Ukrainian female cyclists
Ukrainian track cyclists
Place of birth missing (living people)
21st-century Ukrainian women